Meike is a diminutive of a (regional) short form of Maria. People with the name include:

Meike Babel, German tennis player
Meike de Bruijn (born 1970), Dutch road cyclist
Meike Evers (born 1977), German rower
Meike Freitag (born 1979), German swimmer
Meike Hoffmann (born 1962), German art historian and provenance researcher
Meike Kröger (born 1986), German track and field athlete
Meike de Nooy (born 1983), Dutch water polo player
Meike Schmelzer (born 1993), German handball player
Meike de Vlas (born 1942), Dutch rower
Meike Wortel (born 1982), Dutch bridge player
Meike Ziervogel (born 1967), German writer and publisher
Fictional character
Meike Breuer, character of the German soap opera Verbotene Liebe

See also
Mieke (disambiguation)
Mitsuru Meike (born 1969), Japanese film director, screenwriter, and actor

References

Dutch feminine given names
German feminine given names